Marco Campomenosi (born 2 September 1975 in Genoa) is an Italian politician who was elected as a member of the European Parliament in 2019.

References

Living people
1975 births
MEPs for Italy 2019–2024
Lega Nord MEPs
Lega Nord politicians
Politicians from Genoa